Korniyenko or Kornienko is a Ukrainian-language surname. It is a patronymic surname derived from the first name Korniy (Корній). 

Variants:  Belarusian: Karneyenka (Карнеенка), Russian: Корнеенко [Korneyenko/Korneenko].

People
 Alexei Kornienko (born 1954), Russian-born Austrian conductor and pianist
 Gennady Kornienko, director of the Russian Federal Penitentiary Service
 Georgy Korniyenko (1925–2006), Soviet diplomat
 Maksym Korniyenko (born 1987), Ukrainian basketball player
 Mikhail Kornienko (born 1960), Russian cosmonaut
 Nelly Korniyenko (1938–2019), Soviet actress
 Oleg Kornienko (born 1973), Russian and Kazakhstani footballer
 Oleksandr Kornienko (born 1984), Ukrainian politician
 Valery Kornienko (born 1961), Soviet pair skater
 Valentyn Kornienko (1939–2011), Ukrainian translator
 Viktor Korniyenko (born 1999), Ukrainian footballer

See also
 
 

Ukrainian-language surnames
Patronymic surnames